
Cutaneous amoebiasis,  refers to a form of amoebiasis that presents primarily in the skin. It can be caused by Acanthamoeba or Entamoeba histolytica. When associated with Acanthamoeba, it is also known as "cutaneous acanthamoebiasis". Balamuthia mandrillaris can also cause cutaneous amoebiasis, but can prove fatal if the amoeba enters the bloodstream 

It is characterized by ulcers. Diagnosis of amebiasis cutis calls for high degree of clinical suspicion. This needs to be backed with demonstration of trophozoites from lesions. Unless an early diagnosis can be made such patients can develop significant morbidity.

See also 
 Skin lesion

References

External links 

Cutaneous conditions
Parasitic infestations, stings, and bites of the skin